This is a list of national airlines currently operating in Turkey.

Scheduled airlines

Charter airlines

Cargo airlines

See also
 List of airlines
 List of defunct airlines of Turkey
 List of airports in Turkey

Turkey
Airlines
Airlines
Turkey
Turkey